Interkosmos 22, more commonly known as Bulgaria 1300, was Bulgaria's first artificial satellite.

It was named after the 1300th anniversary of the foundation of the Bulgarian state. It was designed to study the ionosphere and magnetosphere of the Earth.

Description 
The satellite was developed by the Bulgarian Space Agency around the "Meteor" bus, provided by the Soviet Union as part of the Interkosmos program. Assembly took place in Bulgaria, and the spacecraft was launched from Plesetsk in 13:35 local time on 7 August 1981. During that same year the Bulgarian government organized a massive celebration to commemorate the 1300th anniversary of the country's founding. 

Bulgaria 1300 was successfully inserted in a near-polar orbit. The outer skin of the spacecraft, including the solar panels, is coated with a conducting material in order to allow the proper measurement of electric fields and low energy plasma. Power is provided by the two solar panels, which generate 2 kW of electricity. A rechargeable battery pack is used as an energy supply when the spacecraft is in an eclipse period. Gathered data is stored on two tape recorders, each with a capacity of 60 megabits. The main transmitter radiates 10 W in the 130-MHz band. No operational limit was planned.

The spacecraft operated for two years and then data transmission stopped. In the spring of 2016, however, it became clear that the satellite was active. It is not expected to reenter until approximately the year 2550.

Equipment 
The satellite contains a large set of scientific devices, designed and built in Bulgaria: 

 Ion Drift Meter combined with a Retarding Potential Analyzer;
 Spherical Electrostatic Ion Trap (SEIT);
 Cylindrical Langmuir probe;
 Double spherical electron temperature probes;
 Low-Energy Electron-Proton Electrostatic Analyzer Array in 3 orthogonal directions 
 Ion Energy-Mass Composition Analyzers
 Wavelength Scanning UV Photometer  
 Proton Solid-State Telescope  
 Visible Airglow Photometers 
 Triaxial Spherical Vector Electric Field Probes  
 Triaxial Fluxgate Magnetometer

See also 

 Artificial satellite
 Timeline of artificial satellites and space probes

References

Satellites of Bulgaria
Satellites orbiting Earth
First artificial satellites of a country
Bulgaria–Soviet Union relations
Spacecraft launched in 1981
1981 in the Soviet Union
1981 in Bulgaria
Derelict satellites orbiting Earth